Bolshoye Zagarino is a village (selo) in Vachsky District of Nizhny Novgorod Oblast, Russia. Municipally, the village is a part of Chulkovsky Rural Settlement, the administrative center of which is the village of Chulkovo.

History
Before 1929, Bolshoye Zagarino was the center of Zagarinskaya Volost of Muromsky Uyezd of Vladimir Governorate. The volost's larger villages included Bolshoye Zagarino, Krasno, and Maloye Zagarino.

Bolshoye Zagarino is home to Pokrov Church, which was started to be built in 1810. In 1840, a bell tower was added to the church.

References

Sources
Добронравов В. Г., Березин В. М. "Историко-статистическое описание церквей и приходов Владимирской Епархии". Владимир, 1897, с. 288—290. Больше-Загаринский приход.

Rural localities in Nizhny Novgorod Oblast
Vachsky District
Muromsky Uyezd